Marc Henry Aronson (born October 19, 1950) is an American writer, editor, publisher, speaker, and historian. He has written history and biography nonfiction books for children and young adults, as well as nonfiction books for adults about teenage readers.

Biography 
Marc Henry Aronson was born October 19, 1950, the son of the scenic designers Boris Aronson and Lisa Jalowetz Aronson. He is the grandson of rabbi Solomon Aronson, and of the musical conductor Heinrich Jalowetz.

As of June 2012 Aronson wrote a column for School Library Journal called "Consider the Source". As of September 2014 he writes an SLJ blog called "Nonfiction Matters".

In 2001 Aronson won the first Robert F. Sibert Medal for nonfiction for Sir Walter Ralegh and the Quest for El Dorado.

Aronson has a Ph.D. in American History from New York University.  In 1997, he married author Marina Budhos. They have two sons and live in Maplewood, New Jersey.

Aronson is on the School of Library and Information Science faculty at Rutgers University-New Brunswick

Bibliography

Books for Middle-Grade Readers
 Ain’t Nothing but a Man: My Quest to Find the Real John Henry, with Scott Reynolds Nelson, National Geographic Children's Books, 2007
 For Boys Only: The Biggest, Baddest Book Ever, with HP Newquist, Feiwel & Friends, 2007
 The World Made New: Why the Age of Exploration Happened and How It Changed the World, with John W. Glenn, National Geographic Children's Books, 2007
 If Stones Could Speak: Unlocking the Secrets of Stonehenge, National Geographic Children's Books, 2010
 Trapped: How the World Rescued 33 Miners from 2,000 Feet Below the Chilean Desert, Atheneum Books for Young Readers, 2011
 "The Skull in the Rock: How a Scientist a Scientist, A Boy, and Google Earth Opened a New Window Into Human Origins", with Dr. Lee R. Berger National Geographic Children's Books, 2012

Books for Young Adults
 Art Attack: A Brief Cultural History of the Avant-Garde, Clarion Books, 1998
 Sir Walter Ralegh and the Quest for El Dorado, Clarion Books, 2000
 John Winthrop, Oliver Cromwell, and the Land of Promise, Clarion Books, 2004
 The Real Revolution: The Global Story of American Independence, Clarion Books, 2005
 Witch-Hunt: Mysteries of the Salem Witch Trials, Atheneum Books for Young Readers, 2005
 Race: A History Beyond Black and White, Atheneum Books for Young Readers, 2007
 Robert F. Kennedy: Crusader, Viking Juvenile, 2007
 Bill Gates: Tycoon, Viking Juvenile, 2008
 Unsettled: The Problem of Loving Israel, Atheneum Books for Young Readers, 2008
 "Pick-Up-Game: A Full Day of Full Court" (co-editor) Candlewick Press, 2011
 Master of Deceit: J. Edgar Hoover and America in the Age of Lies, Candlewick Press, 2012

Books for adults
 Exploding the Myths: The Truth About Teenagers and Reading, Scarecrow Press, 2001
 Beyond the Pale: New Essays for a New Era, Scarecrow Press, 2003
 Sugar Changed the World, with Marina Budhos, Clarion Books, 2010

References

External links
 
 Nonfiction Matters, Aronson's School Library Journal blog
 

1950 births
Living people
American bloggers
American children's writers
American male bloggers
American male non-fiction writers
American male writers
American people of Austrian-Jewish descent
American people of Ukrainian-Jewish descent
Jewish American writers
New York University alumni
21st-century American historians
21st-century American male writers
21st-century American non-fiction writers
Place of birth missing (living people)